"Sokolský den" ("Sokol Day") also known as "Čtvrtého července" ("4th of July"), is a patriotic march composed by Czech music composer František Kmoch. It was composed in the period short after 1871, when he started working in local Sokol union in Kolín. Solely instrumental composition were later furnished by lyrics of unknown origin with origin in the United States, within the Czech American diaspora. It were later written down by Young Czech politician and writer Karel Tůma. An A-flat major composition later arranged by Czech composer Emil Štolc is written in ternary form. 

The first verse of the lyrics mentions the 4th of July, which refers to Sokol gymnastics gatherings on the date of the United States Independence Day in Prague, promoted by Sokol organizations among the Czech diaspora in the United States. It promoted American liberal values and ideas of American independence as a role model for Czech society dissatisfied with the oppressive regime in Austria-Hungary. The composition is one of the marches of the Czech nationalist gymnastics organization Sokol and reflects 19th century antagonisms towards the results of the Battle of White Mountain in 1620. Other versions of the lyrics also refer 6 July, the anniversary of the death of Jan Hus in 1415.

Adaptation of lyrics of the march also appeared in 1985 comedy-play Dobytí severního pólu by Zdeněk Svěrák and Ladislav Smoljak.

Lyrics

References 

19th-century songs
Czech patriotic songs
Sokol in the United States
Independence Day (United States)